Radioisotope power systems (RPS) are an enabling technology for challenging solar system exploration missions by NASA to destinations where solar energy is weak or intermittent, or where environmental conditions such as dust can limit the ability of a mission to achieve its scientific or operational goals. RPS use the heat generated by the natural radioactive decay of plutonium-238 (Pu-238), in the form of plutonium dioxide. All past RPS used in space have been radioisotope thermoelectric generators (RTGs), which use metallic thermocouples to transform the heat from their nuclear fuel into electrical power, using no moving parts. The currently available RPS, the Multi-Mission Radioisotope Thermoelectric Generator (MMRTG), operates with a beginning-of-life conversion efficiency of about 6.3 percent. 

Dynamic RPS that utilize heat-engines have the potential to be three times more efficient than RTGs, which would allow RPS to use about one-third of the quantity of Pu-238 to produce a similar amount of power. Dynamic RPS also have the potential to provide higher specific power than RTGs, meaning they would provide more power per kilogram of system mass. These features could extend the utility of the heat source plutonium supply reserved for use on NASA missions by the U.S. Department of Energy, and allow for new or more robust concepts for future NASA missions.

Heat-engine thermodynamic cycles that could be useful for space applications include Stirling, Brayton, Rankine, and Ericsson. Engines based on these cycles can be coupled to alternators to provide a ‘convertor’ to transform radioisotope heat source energy into electricity for spacecraft. The potential disadvantage of dynamic RPS is the presence of moving parts. However, analytical studies and experimental evidence from long-term testing suggests the presence of moving parts does not preclude long design life. These types of cycles can be implemented in machines without any wear mechanisms, via design of non-contacting bearings and seals. The elimination of wear mechanisms is a prerequisite for long-life continuous operation necessary for NASA missions. Non-contacting seals can be achieved by use of close clearances with tight-tolerance manufacturing. With this, the design of components falls under the umbrella of standard engineering challenges for which methods exist to achieve the required life.

History 
Stirling and Brayton-cycle technology development has been conducted at NASA Glenn Research Center (formerly NASA Lewis) since the early 1970s. Two recent flight-system projects focused on developing small free-piston Stirling convertors for spaceflight, but they were subsequently cancelled. The Stirling Radioisotope Generator (SRG-110) used a flexure-bearing Stirling convertor, and produced 110 Watts of electricity. The project was planning to build a high-fidelity engineering unit when it was redirected to change to a gas-bearing Stirling convertor to improve overall performance (in terms of efficiency and specific power). This redirection of the project resulted in a name change to the Advanced Stirling radioisotope generator (ASRG). The SRG-110 was under development between 2001 to 2006, and the ASRG was developed between 2006 and 2013. The ASRG project was cancelled in 2013 due to NASA budget constraints.

Current status 
In 2020, a free-piston Stirling power converter reached 15 years of maintenance-free and degradation-free cumulative operation in the Stirling Research Laboratory at NASA Glenn. This duration equals the operational design life of the MMRTG, and is representative of typical mission concepts designed to explore the outer planets or even more distant Kuiper Belt Objects. This unit, called the Technology Demonstration Converter (TDC) #13, is the oldest of several converters that have shown no signs of degradation. Since 2017, the NASA Radioisotope Power Systems Program at NASA Glenn has continued developing several candidate technologies for the first dynamic RPS to fly in space, including designs based on the record-setting TDC #13 and the gas-bearing-based Stirling converter that was used in the ASRG. A small turbo-Brayton system is also under technology development. Several viable generator designs in the range of 100-500 Watts have emerged from the ongoing dynamic conversion technology development effort. In the near-term, a lunar demonstration mission using a dynamic RPS as part of NASA’s Artemis Program could be the first opportunity for a DRPS to be used in spaceflight. The use of DRPS in a lunar-landed payload would enable it to survive and operate productively during the frigidly cold, two-week lunar nights, or in permanently shadowed craters near the moon’s poles.

References

External links 
 NASA's Radioisotope Power Systems Program News
Free Piston Stirling Converter sets record at NASA Glenn Research Center

See also 
Advanced Stirling radioisotope generator
Radioisotope thermoelectric generator
Radioisotope heater unit

Nuclear technology
Electrical generators
Nuclear power in space
Stirling engines